The Woodlands double murders were the murders of pregnant housewife Choong Pei Shan (钟佩珊 Zhōng Peìshān) and her daughter Teo Zi Ning (张梓宁 Zhāng Zǐníng) by her husband Teo Ghim Heng (张锦兴 Zhāng Jĭnxīng) on 20 January 2017. The murders, which took place in their Woodlands flat in Singapore, were supposedly committed due to Teo and his wife arguing with each other about their financial difficulties and during the argument, Teo was provoked by Choong's insults and thus strangled her with a towel, before he killed his daughter Zi Ning. The murder of Choong had also effectively made Teo responsible for murdering his unborn son; Choong was six months' pregnant when her husband killed her.

For the next eight days, Teo tried to mask the deaths of his wife and daughter from his family and tried ways to kill himself, but on 28 January 2017, also the first day of Lunar Chinese New Year, Teo's crime was discovered upon a police report and a simultaneous house visit made by Choong's brother who suspected the absence of his sister and niece. Teo was later arrested, tried and found guilty of the murders, and sentenced to capital punishment by hanging, and lost his appeal against the verdict. Teo is currently on death row in Changi Prison, pending his appeal for clemency.

In light of the case of Seet Cher Hng, who was sentenced to life imprisonment in September 2021 for the murder of his ex-wife at ITE College Central, the Woodlands family murders case was also recalled as one of the most significant four cases of murders committed within families in recent years.

Background
Teo Ghim Heng, alias Eric Teo, was a Singaporean property agent who became married to his wife Choong Pei Shan on 7 December 2009. This was not his and Choong's first marriage, as he and Choong were originally married to different people before their respective divorces. The couple tried to have children, but Choong suffered from several miscarriages. It was only in 2013 when the couple succeeded, and Choong gave birth to their first child, a daughter named Zi Ning. During his time as a property agent, Teo earned between $10,000 and $15,000 a month, and he was considered successful in his career. Many who knew him described Teo as a good father and committed husband, and a good, efficient worker who mixed well with others in his workplace. According to Teo's younger brother Teo Nam Thia, and Teo's mother Cheong Goik Keow, Teo was not one who would confide in his family about whatever family problems he faced.

Sometime in 2014, Teo caught Choong on the bed with another man named Mark Mu, with whom Choong had an affair. He later forgave her after the incident on account of his daughter, whom he at first, suspected could not be his biological child. In 2015, the property market cooled and took a downturn, and Teo's income fell gradually. Also, the huge family expenses Teo bore as the sole breadwinner of the household were gradually becoming harder to cope with, and he also did not pay Zi Ning's school fees for months. He also raked up debts from gambling, as well as borrowing money from his friends, colleagues and financial institutions. The debt culminated into $120,000 by January 2017. In November 2016, he started working as a sales coordinator with a basic monthly salary of $1,500.

Later, Teo's wife became pregnant with their second child, which was confirmed to be a son and Choong would give birth in May 2017. Teo and Choong, in view of their financial troubles, initially wanted to abort the child in November 2016 but decided to not do so after some counselling. Teo even contemplated selling his car and flat to pay off the debts prior to murdering Choong and Zi Ning. He also reportedly tried to ask Choong to take up a part-time job to help him manage the family expenses but she disagreed.

The murders

Deaths of Choong and Zi Ning
On 20 January 2017, around morning, four-year-old Zi Ning was getting ready to go to school. 41-year-old Teo Ghim Heng, who received notifications from the principal to pay Zi Ning's overdue school fees worth $1,700, knew that he would not be able to pay the fees, and he feared of being embarrassed if Zi Ning was asked to leave. Hence he asked Zi Ning to change out of her school uniform and told her to watch television.

When seeing Zi Ning not being taken to school and receiving word that her husband could not pay up the overdue school fees, Choong Pei Shan flared up and argued with Teo over their pre-existing financial situation. In fact, the couple had argued since 13 January over the finances after Teo's creditors went up at their doorstep to demand Teo to pay up; this incident made Choong fully realise the extent of their debt and thus angered at her husband. When he was brought to trial for the murders of his wife and daughter, Teo stated that during the argument, Choong belittled him for being a useless husband and even asked Zi Ning to look at her father as she called him useless. During the argument, Teo claimed that he could not contain his growing rage and thus used a towel to strangle his wife, who was six months pregnant when she died at age 39; the fetus was also killed as a result of Choong's death. He also killed Zi Ning in the same manner, after he allegedly told Zi Ning to join her mother before he would join them.

Post-killing days and discovery
For the next eight days, Teo surfed the internet for ways to commit suicide. He also tried to kill himself in various ways, like slitting his wrists and consuming insecticide, as well as consuming hundreds of paracetamol tablets, but they were unsuccessful. He also penned down four suicide notes to his in-laws and family under his and Choong's names to make it look like he and Choong agreed to kill themselves with their child given their stress over the dire family finances. These days, when phone calls came from his family and Zi Ning's school asking him where Choong and Zi Ning were, he gave excuses by saying that they were busy or were ill, and unable to come. He even said that due to these reasons, he and his wife and daughter cannot go for weekly visits to his family and in-laws for dinner, and tried to delay the plans for Chinese New Year visits. Teo changed his wife's Facebook profile (where Choong often posted their daughter's photos) to make it look like she was still alive.

On 28 January 2017, the first day of Chinese New Year, Choong's brother Choong Mun Chen, also known as Gordon, became suspicious of his absence of his sister and her family from their last night's reunion dinner. Gordon tried calling Teo, but Teo gave the excuse that he could not come until 11 am. He later called in the afternoon through a payphone saying that he was drove out of the house by Choong after an argument, and tried to prevent his family and in-laws from turning up at his flat in Woodlands. During the evening, Gordon, the eldest of the Choong family's three adult children and only son, turned up at Teo's flat after failing multiple times to contact his sister. Accompanied by his other brother-in-law Chris Lam Kwek Fah, Gordon tried to call for his sister to come out, but there was no response. It was only he forced open a window then he smelt a pungent odour.

The pungent smell actually came from the smoke of a fire which Teo earlier alighted onto both the corpses of Choong and Zi Ning to destroy the evidence. Teo also tried to use the same fire to burn himself to death but he subsequently chickened out. Police and firefighters were contacted and they arrived at the flat, where Teo eventually responded and told the people at the scene that his wife and daughter were dead, and it was his fault.

Arrest and murder charges
Right at the scene, Teo was arrested and the charred corpses of the victims were found in the bedroom; he was taken to hospital for treatment of his overdose of paracetamol tablets. On 30 January 2017, Teo was charged with first-degree murder for the double deaths of his wife and daughter. First-degree murder under Section 300(a) of Singapore's Penal Code dictates an offence of murder committed with an intention to kill, and this offence carries the mandatory death penalty in Singapore. Forensic pathologist George Paul later tested the corpses and confirmed that both Zi Ning and her mother died from either strangulation or smothering. Teo was remanded for three weeks to undergo psychiatric evaluation after he spent his first two weeks in remand at the police headquarters for investigation. 

Many neighbours were shocked to hear about the murders, as they knew both Teo and Choong to be polite and friendly people. Many people, including PAP member of Parliament Vikram Nair from Sembawang GRC, came to the funeral to offer condolences to the bereaved family and the victims. The funeral was held by Roland Tay, who later authorised the cremation of the victims' corpses.

Death penalty trial

Proceedings
On 2 July 2019, Teo Ghim Heng first stood trial in the High Court of Singapore for the murders of Choong Pei Shan and Teo Zi Ning. He was represented by leading criminal lawyer Eugene Thuraisingam, and the three-men prosecution team was led by Deputy Public Prosecutor (DPP) Han Ming Kuang (the other members were Dillon Kok and Ng Jun Chong). Teo also faced a third charge of murder for killing his unborn son, but the charge was stood down for the time being whilst his trial for murdering Zi Ning and Choong.

During the trial that lasted from July 2019 to July 2020 (which was delayed half-way partially due to the COVID-19 pandemic in Singapore), Teo gave his account of what happened and raised defences of diminished responsibility and grave and sudden provocation. Teo stated that he was gravely provoked by Choong and her insults during the argument on the day of the murder, which made him lost control out of extreme rage and killed Choong. His lawyer also argued that Zi Ning was the center of the provocation, since she witnessed the argument, which made the defence of provocation effective in Zi Ning's murder as well. Dr Jacob Rajesh, a private psychiatrist, assessed Teo and stated that he suffered from depression due to him getting pressured and depressed by his financial debts, and the condition impaired his mental responsibility and thus qualified him for a defence of diminished responsibility.

However, DPP Han argued that Teo was in full control of himself, as the provocation by Choong's supposed hurtful words was not sufficient to make Teo lose control. Instead, the murders were committed in a methodical manner and not due to loss of self-control. Turning to Zi Ning, she was at the time watching television and playing with her toys, and she was not taking part in the arguments, hence she cannot be responsible for the provocation. Teo was also not suffering from depression, as confirmed by the prosecution's psychiatrist Dr Derrick Yeo, who described Teo's behaviour as "logical, goal-directed and showed planning". He said that Teo was able to make a choice to take his wife's life as he wanted the family to escape the financial burdens and also to not let Zi Ning be alone without love after her parents' deaths. Dr Yeo also stated that if Teo could fabricate suicide notes and tried to find ways to commit suicide, as well as enjoying pornographic material, surfing the internet and watch videos, and observe regular meals and sleeping hours during the eight post-killing days, he was clearly in full control of his mental faculties and planning. Dr Yeo also said that Teo told him during his psychiatric remand that he never regretted killing his wife, but he regretted killing his daughter, whom he called his "dearest".

Not only that, the prosecution presented evidence of Choong's phone messages, in which it showed evidence that Choong already knew about the financial debts since October 2016 and had wanted to help her husband to settle the debts, unlike Teo’s claims that his wife only knew about it days before the murders. Their affectionate messages with each other showed that the couple was optimistic in spite of their difficulties, with Teo looking forward to his job and paying off the debts, and Choong planning to go back to work once their son turned two. They also charged that Teo, despite his denials, had not truly forgiven his wife for her affair with Mark Mu. After closing submissions were made on 5 July 2020 (a month after Singapore ended its circuit breaker measures), the High Court reserved its judgement until 12 November 2020.

Judgement

On 12 November 2020, High Court judge Kannan Ramesh decided on his final verdict, and found Teo guilty of the murders of Choong Pei Shan and Teo Zi Ning under Section 300(a) of the Penal Code. He found that Teo was not suffering from diminished responsibility and sudden and grave provocation. He stated that Teo was able to mix well with his colleagues and maintain good work performance and behaviour despite his increasing financial debts. He stated that Teo's claims of depression did not match to his behaviour before, during and after his crimes as he was able to sleep regular hours, still surfing the Web and Youtube and watch pornographic materials after murdering Choong and Zi Ning, and even meticulously thought of ways to mask the deaths as suicidal and hide the truth of the deaths from his family and in-laws.

Also, even if he was provoked and calmed down, Teo continued to strangle Choong as he, from his account, wanted to kill the family to not let them get burdened by his debts. It was apparent from this claim that Teo's mind was not blinded by rage or loss of self-control, but rather "conscious, deliberate and outcome-driven" after he calmed down. Zi Ning was also innocent of the provocation from Choong and she was not at fault for the couple's arguments since she was not a participant. Hence the defences of diminished responsibility and provocation did not work in Teo's favour.

As a result of his double convictions for intentional murder, 44-year-old Teo Ghim Heng was sentenced to death (the only penalty for first-degree murder in Singapore). Teo confirmed through his lawyer that he would appeal against his conviction and sentence. The prosecution also withdrawn the third charge of murder against Teo for the death of his unborn son.

Teo was one of the only two people to be sentenced to death for murder by the courts of Singapore in 2020. The other person was Ahmed Salim (born 1 January 1989), a Bangladeshi painter who killed his Indonesian girlfriend Nurhidayati Wartono Surata (aged 34) at a Geylang hotel on 30 December 2018, two days before his 30th birthday. After his sentencing took place in the High Court on 14 December 2020, Ahmed's appeal was dismissed by the Court of Appeal on 19 January 2022.

Appeal processes

Court of Appeal
In September 2021, while Teo Ghim Heng is still pending his appeal, another convicted murderer Iskandar Rahmat, who was on death row for a 2013 robbery-murder case, tried to apply for himself to participate in Teo's appeal, so as to provide arguments in support of Teo's constitutionality challenge and to favour his own challenge. The application, however, was disapproved since Iskandar's crime was not related to that of Teo, and the rights to making arguments in Teo's appeal should be reserved to Teo and his defence counsel only. Iskandar's complete exhaustion of his avenues of appeal would make the application unmeritorious if allowed by the appellate court, hence the Court of Appeal dismissed it. It is not known if Teo himself knew about it or if he personally would have allowed Iskandar's participation in his appeal.

On 13 October 2021, 11 months after his trial, Teo Ghim Heng's appeal against his conviction and sentence was heard at the Court of Appeal of Singapore. Once again, Eugene Thuraisingam emphasised to the five-judge appellate panel - which included Chief Justice Sundaresh Menon and four Judges of Appeal Steven Chong, Judith Prakash, Belinda Ang and Chao Hick Tin - about Teo's defence of diminished responsibility, arguing that Teo had, in the aftermath of the killings, tried multiple times to commit suicide but fruitlessly, despite the evidence that Teo often behaved and functioned normally up till the murders. Thuraisingam also raised an constitutionality argument regarding first-degree murder (or intentional murder) under Section 300(a) of the Penal Code of Singapore while declining to proceed with the third defence of sudden and grave provocation. Likewise, the prosecution, led by Winston Man, argued against Thuraisingam's case by citing the High Court's findings on Teo's behaviour before, during and after the murders, which did not substantially support Teo's defence of diminished responsibility, since it is not possible for one who was depressed could be able to function in some scenarios while having the inability to function in another.

After hearing the appeal, the five-judge Court of Appeal spent five months before deciding to dismiss Teo's appeal and affirming his death sentence on 23 February 2022. Justice Judith Prakash, who delivered the verdict, stated that the High Court was correct to identify that Teo did not suffer from diminished responsibility based on his post-killing behaviour and attempts to hide traces of his crime. Justice Prakash also laid out that Teo's reported symptoms were not consistent with the testimonies of his co-workers and family members, which meant that Teo did not suffer from major depressive disorder at all, since he did not display a depressed mood for most of the day nearly everyday or other symptoms like significant weight loss, insomnia or hypersomnia. Having accepted the major points of the lower court's judgement, Justice Prakash and her fellow four judges thus disapproved Teo's appeal and further condemned him to hang for Zi Ning's and Cheong's murders.

Clemency petition
Thuraisingam confirmed that his client will appeal to the President of Singapore Halimah Yacob for clemency as a final recourse to avoid execution.

See also
 Capital punishment in Singapore
 List of major crimes in Singapore (2000–present)
 List of major crimes in Singapore (before 2000)

References

Capital punishment in Singapore
Murder in Singapore
2017 murders in Singapore
2017 in Singapore
January 2017 crimes in Asia
Female murder victims
Murdered Singaporean children
Deaths by strangulation
Deaths by strangulation in Singapore
Violence against women in Singapore